The Plaza de las Cuatro Calles is a square located in the city of Toledo, in Castile-La Mancha, Spain. This square is the commercial heart of Toledo.

Is the center of a five-armed star from which it reaches Zocodover by the north, the Cathedral by the south, the Teatro Rojas by the east and the Alcaná by the west.

References

Plazas in Toledo, Spain